Paulina Beturia was a  Roman convert to Judaism (about the year 50), known under the name "Sarah", who, according to her Latin epitaph, was eighty-six years and six months old at the time of her death. For sixteen years she was a Jew, a mother of the synagogues ("mater synagogarum") of the Campesian and Volumnian communities in Rome.

References

Converts to Judaism from paganism
1st-century Roman women
1st-century Jews
Ancient Jewish women